Christopher Vernard Morris (born January 20, 1966) is an American former professional basketball player. In his 11-season (1988–1999) National Basketball Association (NBA) career, the 6'8" small forward played for the New Jersey Nets, Utah Jazz, and Phoenix Suns. He is a graduate of Atlanta's Douglass High School where his jersey has been retired, and played collegiately for the Auburn Tigers. He scored 8,184 total points in his NBA career.

Early life
Born in Dawson, Georgia, Morris grew up with his mother and stepfather. His parents divorced, and Morris would often work at his grandmother's farm. Morris graduated from Frederick Douglass High School at Atlanta in 1984 where he led the basketball team to the school's only state championship. Morris was named Mr. Basketball for the state of Georgia and Douglass High School retired his jersey number 34 in 1994.

College career
Morris played basketball at Auburn University from 1984 to 1988. Auburn won the SEC men's basketball tournament in 1985. In 1987 and 1988, Morris was a first-team all-SEC pick.

Professional career

NBA

Morris was drafted with the 4th overall pick in 1988 NBA draft. He appeared in the 1989 NBA Slam Dunk Contest, finishing 8th place out of 8 contestants. The following season, Morris started what would be a career-high 76 games while averaging a career-high 14.8 points per game.

Morris developed a reputation as a malcontent and "coach killer." While a member of the Nets, he stopped listening to coach Bill Fitch and refused to enter a game while the team was trying to make the playoffs. When he later joined the Jazz, he and coach Jerry Sloan almost came to blows during practice, and he had to be escorted out of the building by security.

On March 2, 1993, with the New Jersey Nets, he shattered a backboard with a slam dunk during a regular season game against the Chicago Bulls.

With the Utah Jazz, Morris played in the 1997 and 1998 NBA Finals.

Following the 1998–99 NBA lockout, Morris signed with the Phoenix Suns in February 1999.

International
Morris played internationally after 11 seasons with the NBA, starting with Olympiacos B.C. of the Greek Basket League in 1999. However, Olympiacos cut Morris due to a knee injury. Morris joined the Harlem Globetrotters in 2001,  and the Southern California Surf of the ABA signed Morris as a power forward in April 2002,  and Morris later debuted with Purefoods Tender Juicy Hotdogs of the Philippine Basketball Association in July 2002. Morris played with Gaiteros del Zulia of the Venezuelan LPB in the 2003–2004 season.

Lawsuit against Olympiacos
In 2004, Morris won a lawsuit against Olympiacos seeking $1.3 million in owed salary and $400,000 in court costs. US federal judge Christopher A. Boyko permitted American creditors to collect the money in 2009 shortly before Olympiacos visited the Cleveland Cavaliers for an exhibition match.

References

External links
Chris Morris career highs and selected season stats at NBA.com
Chris Morris biography at NBA.com
Basketpedya.com Profile

1966 births
Living people
African-American basketball players
American expatriate basketball people in Greece
American expatriate basketball people in the Philippines
American expatriate basketball people in Venezuela
American men's basketball players
Auburn Tigers men's basketball players
Basketball players from Atlanta
Gaiteros del Zulia players
Greek Basket League players
Harlem Globetrotters players
Magnolia Hotshots players
New Jersey Nets draft picks
New Jersey Nets players
Olympiacos B.C. players
Philippine Basketball Association imports
Phoenix Suns players
Small forwards
Utah Jazz players
21st-century African-American people
20th-century African-American sportspeople